Berbești is a town located in Vâlcea County, Romania, about 78 km south-west from Râmnicu Vâlcea, in the historical region of Oltenia. It was granted town status by law in October 2003. As of January 2009, it has a population of 5,635.

The town administers five villages: Dămțeni, Dealu Aluniș, Roșioara, Târgu Gângulești and Valea Mare.

Geography and climate
Set on the lower course of the river Tărâia, a tributary of the Olteț, Berbești is crossed by the 45th parallel north. 

Berbești is bordered by Mateești commune to the north, Sinești commune to the south, Alunu to the west and Copăceni to the east.

Economy
The main economic activity is coal mining that began in the 1970s. Following the economic reforms in the late 1990s, Berbești saw an economic downturn similar to most of the mono-industrial towns in Romania.

Notes

Populated places in Vâlcea County
Towns in Romania
Monotowns in Romania
Localities in Oltenia